Entomological Reflections is an album by the group Mephista, which comprises pianist Sylvie Courvoisier, electronic artist Ikue Mori and percussionist Susie Ibarra, which was released on the Tzadik label in 2004.

Reception

Sean Westergaard of AllMusic stated, "Each of these players has a highly individual voice on her respective instrument, and together they are three of the finest improvising women on the scene. This album isn't likely to get any toes tapping, but will reward careful listening."

Track listing 
All compositions by Mephista except as indicated
 "La Femme 100 Têtes" - 2:46   
 "House" (Ikue Mori) - 3:18   
 "Drôle de Mots" (Sylvie Courvoisier) - 5:31   
 "Cardiogram" (Courvoisier) - 5:46   
 "Void" - 3:44   
 "Fractions" - 3:46   
 "Entomological Souvenirs" - 2:53   
 "La Château de Cène" - 4:49   
 "Fringe" - 1:49   
 "Procession" (Susie Ibarra) - 4:10   
 "Beloukia" - 2:44   
 "Air" (Ibarra) - 5:21   
 "Apartment" (Mori) - 0:46   
 "Sans Mots" (Courvoisier) - 4:43   
 "Shifting Roll" (Mori) - 4:11

Personnel 
 Sylvie Courvoisier – piano 
 Ikue Mori – laptop
 Susie Ibarra - drums

References 

2004 albums
Sylvie Courvoisier albums
Tzadik Records albums